The Camptandriidae are a family of crabs, with 38 species in 21 genera:

Baruna Stebbing, 1904
Calabarium Manning & Holthuis, 1981
Camptandrium Stimpson, 1858
Cleistostoma De Haan, 1833
Deiratonotus Manning & Holthuis, 1981
Ecphantor Manning & Holthuis, 1981
Ilyogynnis Manning & Holthuis, 1981
Lillyanella Manning & Holthuis, 1981
Manningis Al-Khayat & Jones, 1996
Moguai C. G. S. Tan & Ng, 1999
Mortensenella Rathbun, 1909
Nanusia C. G. S. Tan & Ng, 1999
Nasima Manning, 1991
Paracleistostoma De Man, 1895
Paratylodiplax Serène, 1974
Serenella Manning & Holthuis, 1981
Takedellus C. G. S. Tan & Ng, 1999
Telmatothrix Manning & Holthuis, 1981
Tylodiplax De Man, 1895

References

Ocypodoidea
Decapod families